Yelansky is a rural locality (a khutor) in Bukanovskoye Rural Settlement, Kumylzhensky District, Volgograd Oblast, Russia. The population was 39 as of 2010.

Geography 
Yelansky is located in forest steppe, on Khopyorsko-Buzulukskaya Plain, on the right bank of the Don River, 53 km southwest of Kumylzhenskaya (the district's administrative centre) by road. Tyukovnoy is the nearest rural locality.

References 

Rural localities in Kumylzhensky District